Okeford Fitzpaine  is a village and civil parish in the English county of Dorset, situated in the Blackmore Vale  south of the town of Sturminster Newton. It is sited on a thin strip of greensand under the scarp face of the Dorset Downs. In the 2011 census the civil parish—which includes the village of Belchalwell to the west and most of the hamlet of Fiddleford to the north—had 404 dwellings, 380 households and a population of 913.

History
Prehistoric remains within the parish include three cross dykes and five round barrows on the chalk hills south of the village, and an Iron Age hill fort on Banbury Hill, towards Sturminster Newton.

In 1086 in the Domesday Book Okeford Fitzpaine was recorded as Adford; it had 40 households, 16 ploughlands,  of meadow and one mill. It was in Sturminster Newton Hundred and the tenant-in-chief was Glastonbury Abbey. Since then it has been known as "Aukford Alured" and "Ockford Phippin", the latter echoing the modern colloquial "Fippenny Ockford" and its shorthand, "Ockford".

The present parish of Okeford Fitzpaine includes several areas that used to be within other parishes: Banbury Common (formerly in Child Okeford parish), the centre of the old parish of Belchalwell (plus four of its five separated parts), and part of Fiddleford (east of the Darknoll Brook). Until 1966 almost the entire village was owned by the Pitt-Rivers family, so it has no "big house", and comprised mostly tenant farmers. The village was sold off at auction by his mistress Stella Lonsdale following the death in 1966 of George Pitt-Rivers, who specified that the Estate not be sold as such, but that each property be sold individually, so that existing tenants might buy their leased farms.

Governance
In the United Kingdom national parliament, Okeford Fitzpaine is in the North Dorset parliamentary constituency which is represented by Simon Hoare of the Conservative party. In local government Okeford is governed by Dorset Council at the highest tier and Okeford Fitzpaine Parish Council at the lowest tier. The first meeting of the parish council took place on 1 January 1895.

For electoral purposes in national government and district council elections, Okeford Fitzpaine is in Bulbarrow electoral ward. In national parliamentary elections this is joined with 26 other wards that together elect the Member of Parliament for the North Dorset constituency.

Okeford Fitzpaine falls within the unitary authority of Dorset, having been part of the North Dorset non-metropolitan district until local government structural changes took effect on 1 April 2019.  The authority is administered by Dorset Council, which has 82 councillors elected from 52 wards. The Conservative party has overall control following elections in May 2019.

Education
There is a small but thriving Church of England Voluntary Aided Primary School classified in 2015 by OFSTED as "Good".  The school was virtually destroyed by fire during World War II, and many village records were lost.

There is also the Oak Tree Pre-School.

Notable buildings
Within the parish are 61 structures that are listed by Historic England for their historic or architectural interest. Two of these – the Parish Church of St Andrew and the Church of St Aldhelm – have Grade II* status, with all other listed structures being Grade II. Among these are a barn off High Street; a green-painted K6 telephone kiosk by the post office;  of raised pavement in Shillingstone Lane; a table tomb in St Andrew's churchyard; and another in St Aldhelm's churchyard.

The Parish Church of St Andrew is built from greensand and Marnhull limestone and has a 14th-century tower arch and west window, a mid-15th-century west tower, and a 19th-century chancel. The aisles and nave are also 19th century, though they incorporate some 15th-century elements. The pulpit is 15th century, albeit much restored.

The Church of St Aldhelm, formerly the parish church of Belchalwell, is in the southwestern part of the parish. The nave has late-12th-century origins, though only part of the south wall remains from this date. The south doorway is well preserved, dating to about 1190, and is ornamented with chevron and dog-tooth patterning. The north aisle, chancel, south tower and south porch are 15th-century additions, though at the end of the 19th century the east wall of the chancel and all the north aisle were largely rebuilt, as were the west walls of the nave and south porch.

The Old Rectory has a main block that was probably built in the mid 18th century by the Rev Duke Butler; it has a symmetrical five-bay east front comprising rendered walls above ashlar and rubble plinths. An earlier brick-walled kitchen wing to the northwest has a large fireplace with a chamfered bressummer.

There is what remains of a Cross of ashlar, that comprises two square steps under a chamfered plinth, on which stands an octagonal cross-base, chamfered on top, with broach stops occupying the corners of the square. The tenon of the cross-shaft still lodges in a square mortice at the centre of the octagon, but the rest has gone.

Community facilities
Okeford Fitzpaine has a village hall, which can cater for conferences of up to 140 people and parties of up to 200; it has full facilities for people with disabilities. The village also has The Royal Oak public house and a village Post Office and shop, "The Okeford Stores".

People
In 2015 the village had 333 houses, with 33 more under construction on land once occupied by Phillips's Hillview Dairy. Plans are being formulated for perhaps another 100, some on the land occupied by the defunct chicken farm, some on land occupied by the defunct Wessex Homes mobile home factory, and some on Pleydell's Farm in the middle of the village.

TV presenter Jack Hargreaves, known for having devised and presented How!, Out of Town and Old Country, lived at Belchalwell.

References

External links

 Okeford Fitzpaine Website
 Photographs of the church and of gravestones, and many useful Links

Villages in Dorset